The following United States Army units and commanders fought in the Battle of McDowell of the American Civil War. The Confederate order of battle is listed separately.

Abbreviations used

Military rank
 MG = Major General
 BG = Brigadier General
 Col = Colonel
 Ltc = Lieutenant Colonel
 Maj = Major
 Cpt = Captain

Mountain Department
MG John C. Frémont (not present)

Union Forces Around McDowell
BG Robert H. Milroy
BG Robert C. Schenck

References
 May 8, 1862 - Engagement Near McDowell (Bull Pasture Mountain), Va. The War of the Rebellion: A Compilation of the Official Records of the Union and Confederate Armies. United States War Department.  Volume XII, Chapter XXIV, pp. 460–488.  (1885)

American Civil War orders of battle